Silkstone may refer to:

Places
Silkstone, Queensland, a suburb of Ipswich, Queensland, Australia
Silkstone, a village in South Yorkshire, England

Music
Silkstone (group), Dutch pop band fronted by vocalist Niels Geusebroek

Other
Binghamite, which also goes by the name silkstone
Silkstone®, the simulated porcelain material used for the adult collector Barbie Fashion Model Collection dolls
The Silkstone Waggonway was an early British railway